For the 1977 Vuelta a España, the field consisted of 70 riders; 54 finished the race.

By rider

By nationality

References

1977 Vuelta a España
1977